Bozusha (also Romanized as Bozūshā; also known as Bazoo Shah, Bazūshāh, Bazushakh, Bozowshā, and Bozūsheh) is a village in Qanibeyglu Rural District, Zanjanrud District, Zanjan County, Zanjan Province, Iran. At the 2006 census, its population was 768, in 172 families.

References 

Populated places in Zanjan County